Giulio Zeppieri (born 7 December 2001) is an Italian professional tennis player.

Zeppieri has a career high ATP singles ranking of No. 127 achieved on 20 February 2023. He also has a career high ATP doubles ranking of No. 242 achieved on 4 April 2022.

Professional career

2019
Zeppieri was one of the alternates for the 2019 Next Generation ATP Finals.

2020-2021: ATP debut, First Challenger title, Top 250 debut
Zeppieri made his ATP main draw debut at the 2020 Forte Village Sardegna Open after receiving a wildcard for the singles main draw.

In August 2021, he won his first Challenger in Barletta, Italy defeating compatriot Flavio Cobolli. As a result he reached a new career-high inside the top 300 at No. 251 on 30 August 2021 and later inside the top 250 at No. 245 on 20 September 2021.

2022: Grand Slam & Masters 1000 debut, first ATP semifinal & top 150 debut
He qualified into the main draw for his first Masters 1000 at the 2022 Italian Open (tennis) on his second attempt defeating 14th seeded Maxime Cressy in the qualifying competition.

He made his Grand Slam debut at the 2022 French Open after qualifying for the main draw with a win over wildcard Frenchman Sean Cuenin.

He recorded his first ATP win as a qualifier at the 2022 Croatia Open Umag over Pedro Cachin.
Next he defeated Daniel Elahi Galan to reach the quarterfinals. As a result he moved into the top 150 in the rankings. Next he defeated Bernabe Zapata Miralles in straight sets to reach his first semifinal of his career.

2023: Second Challenger title 
He won his second Challenger title in Cherbourg defeating Titouan Droguet.

Challenger and ITF World Tennis Tour Finals

Singles 5 (3-2)

Doubles

References

External links
 
 

2001 births
Living people
Italian male tennis players
Tennis players from Rome
People from Latina, Lazio
Sportspeople from the Province of Latina
21st-century Italian people